Stefan Reinartz (born 1 January 1989) is a German former professional footballer who played a defensive midfielder or defender.

Career
Reinartz was born in Engelskirchen, North Rhine-Westphalia. He came through the ranks at Bayer Leverkusen, but did not play any games for them in the 2008–09 season. He made his professional debut in the Second Division while on loan with 1. FC Nürnberg on 9 February 2009 when he started a match against 1. FC Kaiserslautern. Reinartz played 163 German top-flight matches. The defender won three caps for Germany. He announced his retirement, at age 27, on 27 May 2016 due to injuries.

References

External links
 
 
 
 
 
 

1989 births
Living people
German footballers
1. FC Nürnberg players
Bayer 04 Leverkusen players
Bayer 04 Leverkusen II players
Eintracht Frankfurt players
Bundesliga players
2. Bundesliga players
Association football defenders
Germany youth international footballers
Germany under-21 international footballers
Germany international footballers
Footballers from North Rhine-Westphalia